Tabernaemontana coffeoides is a species of flowering plant in the Apocynaceae family. Its fragrant flowers feature white corolla lobes. Its habitat is on dunes or on rocks in dry forest, bush or savanna from sea level to  altitude. Local medicinal uses include for weight loss and to combat fatigue. Tabernaemontana coffeoides is native to Seychelles, the Comoros and Madagascar. It is also rich in pharmacologically interesting indole alkaloids.

References

coffeoides
Plants described in 1844
Plants used in traditional African medicine
Flora of the Comoros
Flora of Madagascar
Flora of Seychelles
Taxa named by Wenceslas Bojer
Taxa named by Alphonse Pyramus de Candolle